Futurama is the second album by the band  released in 1975 and generally classified musically as a progressive rock album.

Background and recording 

Release 

Futurama was released in July 1975 by record label Harvest.

The album was re-released in early 1991 with three bonus tracks.

Reception 

Although critics were not always open to the mix of styles,  and Nelson's music received a fairly warm welcome from the music critic of The New York Times.  started his article with a fairly scathing dismissal of English musical acts:

"Every month or is it week? seems to bring a new rock band from Britain, eager to catch a few leftover crumbs from the Anglophilia of the 1960s. Most fail completely; others latch onto an FM cult success; a very few, unpredictably, make it big..."

Although his opening seems to dismiss British music as hanging on to fame gained during the 1960s, Rockwell goes on to say:

"Be-Bop Deluxe is redeemed by the brilliance of [the band's] playing, and particularly Nelson's guitar playing. His records put Nelson right up there with the other great masters of the electric guitar."

In   described the album as:

"Top-heavy with massed guitars and melodic ideas pursued on a whim and just as quickly abandoned, it nevertheless contained two of the most perfect pop singles never to make the charts –  and 

Q Magazine described the album as ' an accomplished melding of pomp, prog and pop'.

Track listing

Personnel
Be-Bop Deluxe
Bill Nelson – guitar, lead and backing vocals, keyboards
Charlie Tumahai – Fender bass, backing vocals
Simon Fox – drums, percussion
with:
Andy Evans - bass on "Jean Cocteau"
The Grimethorpe Colliery Band - brass band on "Music in Dreamland"; conducted by John Berryman; arranged by Sir Peter Oxendale
Technical
Gary Lyons, Pat Moran - engineer
George Hardie - cover art, design

References 

Be-Bop Deluxe albums
1975 albums
Albums produced by Roy Thomas Baker
Harvest Records albums
Progressive rock albums by English artists
Albums recorded at Rockfield Studios